Ridge Wood Military Cemetery (misspelt Ridgewood on the entrance stone) is a Commonwealth War Graves Commission (CWGC) burial ground for the dead of British Commonwealth soldiers who fought in the First World War. The cemetery is in Voormezeele, West Flanders, Belgium, in the Ypres Salient of the Western Front.

The cemetery grounds were assigned to the United Kingdom in perpetuity by King Albert I of Belgium in recognition of the sacrifices made by the British Empire in the defence and liberation of Belgium during the war.

Foundation
The cemetery was established in May 1915 for front line troops defending the area. The cemetery was used by the Royal Irish Rifles, the Durham Light Infantry and Canadian battalions.

The cemetery is in a dip behind a ridge that was the site of a wood. In the German spring offensive of 1918, German forces pushed the front line on to the ridge, being moved back in July, before being swept away completely later in the year during the Hundred Days Offensive by the 6th and 33rd Divisions.

Of the 621 burials at the site, 292 are from Canada, 280 from the United Kingdom, 44 from Australia and 3 from New Zealand, in addition to two from Germany. The cemetery previously contained graves of a number of French soldiers, but these were concentrated elsewhere later.

The cemetery was designed by British architect Sir Edwin Lutyens.

References

External links
 
 
 

Commonwealth War Graves Commission cemeteries in Belgium
World War I cemeteries in Belgium
Cemeteries and memorials in West Flanders
Works of Edwin Lutyens in Belgium